Otto Carius (27 May 1922 – 24 January 2015) was a German tank commander in the Wehrmacht during World War II. He fought on the Eastern Front in 1943 and 1944 and on the Western Front in 1945. Carius is considered a "panzer ace", some sources credited him with destroying more than 150 enemy tanks, although Carius, in an interview claims he had around 100 kills or less. This was also due to the fact that he did not count kills as a commander, and rather only as a gunner. He was a recipient of the Knight's Cross of the Iron Cross with Oak Leaves.

World War II
Carius graduated from school in 1940, a year following the commencement of the Second World War. He enlisted in the army and was only accepted after twice being rejected as unfit for military service for being underweight. He first served in the infantry before volunteering for the Panzer branch; his father referred to tanks as "metal deathtraps." Carius was transferred to the 502nd Heavy Panzer Battalion in 1943 and fought in the northern sectors of the Eastern Front. 

At the beginning of 1945 he was made commander of a Jagdtiger company of the 512th Heavy Anti-tank Battalion, which by that time was engaged in fighting on the Western Front. On 8 March 1945, the 2nd Company was directed to the front line near Siegburg, where it took part in the defense of the Rhine against the American forces crossing the river, with limited success. Eventually, after being trapped in the Ruhr Pocket east of the Rhine, he ordered all his Jagdtigers destroyed to prevent enemy forces from capturing them intact and then surrendered to the US Army on 7 May. He was released from captivity on 21 May, two weeks later.

He is considered a "panzer ace", credited with destroying more than 150 enemy tanks; most of his kill claims were on the Eastern Front. He claimed in his autobiography that his gunner shot down a soviet plane attacking their tank, possibly an IL-2 with a Tiger I's 88mm main gun in late 1943 on the Eastern Front.

Later life
After the war, Carius studied pharmacy at Heidelberg University and set up a pharmacy which he named the "Tiger Apotheke" as a tribute to the Tiger tank. He also authored a book about his wartime experiences called "Tigers in the Mud", which was released in 1960. Carius ran his pharmacy until retiring in 2011. He died on 24 January 2015 at age 92.

Works
 Tigers in the Mud: The Combat Career of German Panzer Commander Otto Carius. Mechanicsburg, PA: Stackpole Books. . The book was adapted into a manga by Hayao Miyazaki.

Awards
 Iron Cross (1939) 2nd Class (15 September 1942) & 1st Class (23 November 1943)
 Knight's Cross of the Iron Cross with Oak Leaves
 Knight's Cross on 4 May 1944 as Leutnant of the Reserves and platoon leader in the 2./schwere Panzer-Abteilung 502
 535th Oak Leaves on 27 July 1944 as Leutnant of the Reserves and leader of the 2./schwere Panzer-Abteilung 502
Panzer Badge in Silver  2nd Grade (15 July 1944) & 3rd Grade (1 September 1944)
Wound Badge in Black (8 July 1941), in Silver (15 December 1943) & in Gold (11 September 1944)

See also
 Michael Wittmann
 Kurt Knispel

References

Citations

Bibliography

External links
 Otto Carius – Hitler’s Tank Ace. Opinion about Americans. Biography and Facts
Tigers in the mud, book read out loud, Youtube

1922 births
2015 deaths
People from Zweibrücken
Panzer commanders
Recipients of the Knight's Cross of the Iron Cross with Oak Leaves
German pharmacists
Heidelberg University alumni
German prisoners of war in World War II held by the United States
Military personnel from Rhineland-Palatinate
German autobiographers
German military writers
German Army officers of World War II